Zbigniew Makowski (31 January 1930 – 19 August 2019) was a Polish painter.

Zbigniew Makowski was born in 1930. Three of his works are in the permanent collection in New York's Museum of Modern Art (MoMA).

Makowski died in August 2019, aged 89.

References

External links
 Zbigniew Makowski, culture.pl

1930 births
2019 deaths
Polish painters
Polish male painters